Hopea fluvialis is a tree in the family Dipterocarpaceae, native to Borneo. The specific epithet fluvialis means "of rivers", referring to species' habitat.

Description
It may also have buttresses and stilt roots. The bark is smooth.

Distribution and habitat
Hopea fluvialis is endemic to Borneo.

Conservation
Hopea fluvialis has been assessed as near threatened on the IUCN Red List. It is threatened by land conversion for tree plantations and agriculture and by logging for its timber. In Sarawak, fires are also a threat. The species is found in two protected areas in Sarawak.

References

fluvialis
Endemic flora of Borneo
Plants described in 1962